The 2016–17 season was Al-Shorta's 43rd season in the Iraqi Premier League, having featured in all 42 previous editions of the competition. Al-Shorta participated in the Iraqi Premier League and the Iraq FA Cup.

They entered this season having finished in a disappointing seventh place in the league in the 2015–16 season. They were much better during this season, and were still in contention for the league title on the final day of the campaign, but a loss to Al-Minaa saw them finish in third place and miss out on continental qualification. They were knocked out of the Iraq FA Cup at the Round of 32 stage, losing at home to lower division side Al-Jaish; that defeat led to the sacking of manager Mohamed Youssef in March, who was replaced by Nadhum Shaker. The former club president Ayad Bunyan was re-elected into office early in August, following his exit midway through the 2014–15 season.

Squad

Out on loan

Departed during season

Personnel

Technical Staff

Management

Kit
Supplier: Adidas

Transfers

In

Out

Competitions

Iraqi Premier League

Iraq FA Cup

References

External links
Al-Shorta website
Al-Shorta TV
Team info at goalzz.com

Al-Shorta SC seasons
Al Shorta